Fred Kratky (born July 7, 1942) is an American politician. He was a member of the Missouri House of Representatives, having served from 2002 to 2008. He is a member of the Democratic party.

References

1942 births
Living people
Democratic Party members of the Missouri House of Representatives